The Men's scratch competition at the 2017 World Championships was held on 13 April 2017.

Results
First rider across the line without a net lap loss wins.

References

Men's scratch
UCI Track Cycling World Championships – Men's scratch